Calathium is an extinct genus of organism found in marine beds of Ordovician age. Its classification is enigmatic: It has long been placed among the receptaculites, but it has also been described as a quasi-sponge, possibly akin to the archeocyathids or other hypercalcified sponge. The chief difference from archaeocyathids is that their walls were connected by rods rather than septae.

The organisms were important reef-forming organisms during the Ordovician, forming communities with lithistid sponges that gradually displaced the earlier microbial mounds.

References 

Paleozoic life
Sponges